Rockwell may refer to:

Arts, entertainment, and media 
 Rockwell (album), a 2009 mini-album by Anni Rossi 
 Rockwell, a fictional town and setting of They Hunger
 Rockwell, a 1994 film about Porter Rockwell
 Rockwell, Maine, a fictional town in The Iron Giant

Brands and enterprises
 Rockwell International, a former defense company in the United States, portions of which are now owned by ArvinMeritor, Boeing Integrated Defense Systems, Pratt & Whitney Rocketdyne, and United Technologies
 Rockwell Automation, an industrial automation company that descended from Rockwell International
 Rockwell Collins, a communications and aviation electronics company that also descended from Rockwell International, and now part of United Technologies' Collins Aerospace division.
 Rockwell Semiconductor, a semiconductor company that also descended from Rockwell International, now known as Conexant
 Rockwell Diamonds, a mid-tier high-value gem diamond producer based in South Africa and headquartered in Canada
Rockwell Tools, a line of power tools owned and distributed by China-based Positec Tool Corporation

People 
 Norman Rockwell, an American artist and illustrator
 Rockwell (keyboardist), keyboardist for Danava
 Rockwell (musician) (Kennedy William Gordy), a 1980s R&B musician and a son of Motown Records founder Berry Gordy
 Rockwell (surname), several people with the surname
 Rockwell J. Flint, an American politician
 Rockwell Kent, an American artist
 Rockwell A. Schnabel, an American businessman and diplomat

Places

United States 
 Rockwell, Arkansas
 Rockwell, Iowa
 Rockwell, North Carolina
 Rockwell, Washington
 Rockwell City, Iowa 
 Rockwell Field, a defunct United States Air Force base, San Diego, California
 Rockwell Lake, a lake in Minnesota
 Rockwell Township, Norman County, Minnesota
Rockwell (CTA), a station on the Chicago Transit Authority's Brown Line

Elsewhere 
 Rockwell Center, an upscale urban area in Makati, Philippines
 Rockwell Green, a village in West Somerset, England

Other uses
 Rockwell (typeface), a typeface
 Rockwell, the original name for Intel's microarchitecture released in second half of 2014 (now called Broadwell)
 Norman Rockwell Museum, home to the world's largest collection of original Norman Rockwell art, in Stockbridge, Massachusetts
 Rockwell College, a secondary school in South Tipperary, Ireland
 Rockwell scale, a scale of material hardness